Russian Socialist Party (RSP) was a political party in Russia led by Vladimir Bryntsalov.

Despite the leftist-sounding name, the main priorities of the activities indicated in the party's program are the ideas of moderate conservatism, traditionalism and social orientation. Other value orientations were most fully presented in other program documents of the RSP, however, in fact, they did not find their embodiment in practice.

The RSP was formed at the Constituent Congress on April 27, 1996. Like many other electoral associations of that period, in the second half of the 1990s, the party developed a new version of amendments and additions to its Charter, which was associated with obtaining the status of a political public association. The Russian Socialist Party was registered by the Ministry of Justice of the Russian Federation on December 7, 1998. The chairman of the party during its existence was Vladimir Alekseevich Bryntsalov. As a result of the 1999 parliamentary elections, 0.24% of citizens who took part in the voting voted for the Russian Socialist Party.

As a result, the party did not receive any seats in the State Duma, however, Vladimir Bryntsalov won the Orekhovo-Zuyevo constituency and joined the People's Deputy parliamentary group. In 2001, the party disbanded and entered in the United Russia.

References

1996 establishments in Russia
2001 disestablishments in Russia
Conservative parties in Russia
Defunct conservative parties
Defunct political parties in Russia
Paternalistic conservatism
Political parties disestablished in 2001
Political parties established in 1996
Social conservative parties
United Russia